This is a list of beaches in Italy.

Beaches in Italy

 Francavilla al Mare, Abruzzo
 Giulianova, Abruzzo
 Montesilvano, Abruzzo
 Ortona, Abruzzo
 Pescara, Abruzzo
 Tortoreto Lido, Abruzzo
 Alba Adriatica, Abruzzo
 Villa Rosa, Abruzzo
 Martinsicuro, Abruzzo
 Roseto degli Abruzzi, Abruzzo
 San Salvo, Abruzzo
 Vasto, Abruzzo
 Alessano, Apulia
 Alliste, Apulia
 Andrano, Apulia
 Castrignano del Capo, Apulia
 Castro, Apulia
 Corsano, Apulia
 Diso, Apulia
 Gagliano del Capo, Apulia
 Galatone, Apulia
 Gallipoli, Apulia
 Lecce, Apulia
 Manfredonia, Apulia
 Melendugno, Apulia
 Molfetta, Apulia
 Monopoli, Apulia
 Morciano di Leuca, Apulia
 Nardò, Apulia
 Peschici, Apulia
 Polignano a Mare, Apulia
 Porto Cesareo, Apulia
 Rodi Garganico, Apulia
 Ugento, Apulia
 Maratea, Basilicata
 Pisticci, Basilicata
 Policoro, Basilicata
 Amantea, Calabria
 Acquappesa, Calabria
 Ardore, Calabria
 Badolato, Calabria
 Bagnara, Calabria
 Belcastro, Calabria
 Belmonte Calabro, Calabria
 Belvedere Marittimo, Calabria
 Bianco, Calabria
 Borgia, Calabria
 Botricello, Calabria
 Bovalino, Calabria
 Bova Marina, Calabria
 Brancaleone, Calabria
 Briatico, Calabria
 Calopezzati, Calabria
 Campora San Giovanni, Calabria
 Capo Colonna, Calabria
 Capo Vaticano, Calabria
 Catanzaro, Calabria
 Caulonia, Calabria
 Cetraro, Calabria
 Cirò Marina, Calabria
 Coreca, Calabria
 Cropani, Calabria
 Crotone, Calabria
 Crucoli, Calabria
 Davoli, Calabria
 Diamante, Calabria
 Drapia, Calabria
 Falerna, Calabria
 Francavilla Marittima, Calabria
 Fuscaldo, Calabria
 Gioia Tauro, Calabria
 Grisolia, Calabria
 Grotteria, Calabria
 Guardavalle, Calabria
 Guardia Piemontese, Calabria
 Isca sullo Ionio, Calabria
 Isola di Capo Rizzuto, Calabria
 Joppolo, Calabria
 Locri, Calabria
 Longobardi, Calabria
 Mandatoriccio, Calabria
 Melissa, Calabria
 Melito di Porto Salvo, Calabria
 Monasterace, Calabria
 Montepaone, Calabria
 Nocera Terinese, Calabria
 Nicotera, Calabria
 Palizzi, Calabria
 Palmi, Calabria
 Paola, Calabria
 Parghelia, Calabria
 Pizzo, Calabria
 Praia a Mare, Calabria
 Reggio Calabria, Calabria
 Riace, Calabria
 Ricadi, Calabria
 Rocca Imperiale, Calabria
 Roccella Ionica, Calabria
 Roseto Capo Spulico, Calabria
 Sangineto, Calabria
 Santa Caterina dello Ionio, Calabria
 Santa Maria del Cedro, Calabria
 San Lucido, Calabria
 San Nicola Arcella, Calabria
 San Sostene, Calabria
 Scalea, Calabria
 Scilla, Calabria
 Siderno, Calabria
 Soverato, Calabria
 Squillace, Calabria
 Tortora, Calabria
 Trebisacce, Calabria
 Tropea, Calabria
 Vibo Valentia, Calabria
 Villapiana, Calabria
 Villa San Giovanni, Calabria
 Zambrone, Calabria
 Acciaroli, Campania
 Agropoli, Campania
 Amalfi, Campania
 Anacapri, Campania
 Ascea, Campania
 Atrani, Campania
 Bacoli, Campania
 Camerota, Campania
 Capaccio, Campania
 Capri, Campania
 Castellabate, Campania
 Castellammare di Stabia, Campania
 Castel Volturno, Campania
 Citara, Campania
 Cellole, Campania
 Centola, Campania
 Cetara, Campania
 Eboli, Campania
 Ercolano, Campania
 Forio, Campania
 Furore, Campania
 Giugliano in Campania, Campania
 Ischia, Campania
 Maiori, Campania
 Minori, Campania
 Mondragone, Campania
 Monte di Procida, Campania
 Napoli, Campania
 Palinuro, Campania
 Pollica, Campania
 Pompeii, Campania
 Portici, Campania
 Positano, Campania
 Pozzuoli, Campania
 Praiano, Campania
 Procida, Campania
 Ravello, Campania
 Salerno, Campania
 San Giovanni a Piro, Campania
 Sapri, Campania
 Sessa Aurunca, Campania
 Sorrento, Campania
 Torre Annunziata, Campania
 Torre del Greco, Campania
 Vico Equense, Campania
 Vietri sul Mare, Campania
 Bellaria-Igea Marina, Emilia Romagna
 Cattolica, Emilia Romagna
 Cervia, Emilia Romagna
 Cesenatico, Emilia Romagna
 Gatteo, Emilia Romagna
 Misano Adriatico, Emilia Romagna
 Ravenna, Emilia Romagna
 Riccione, Emilia Romagna
 Rimini, Emilia Romagna
 San Mauro Pascoli, Emilia Romagna
 Savignano sul Rubicone, Emilia Romagna
 Grado, Italy, Friuli Venezia Giulia
 Lignano, Friuli Venezia Giulia
 Alassio, Liguria
 Albenga, Liguria
 Albisola Superiore, Liguria
 Albissola Marina, Liguria
 Ameglia, Liguria
 Arenzano, Liguria
 Bergeggi, Liguria
 Bogliasco, Liguria
 Bonassola, Liguria
 Bordighera, Liguria
 Borghetto Santo Spirito, Liguria
 Borgio Verezzi, Liguria
 Camogli, Liguria
 Camporosso, Liguria
 Celle Ligure, Liguria
 Ceriale, Liguria
 Cervo, Liguria
 Chiavari, Liguria
 Cipressa, Liguria
 Cogoleto, Liguria
 Costarainera, Liguria
 Deiva Marina, Liguria
 Diano Marina, Liguria
 Finale Ligure, Liguria
 Framura, Liguria
 Genoa, Liguria
 Imperia, Liguria
 Laigueglia, Liguria
 La Spezia, Liguria
 Lavagna, Liguria
 Lerici, Liguria
 Levanto, Liguria
 Loano, Liguria
 Moneglia, Liguria
 Monterosso al Mare, Liguria
 Noli, Liguria
 Ospedaletti, Liguria
 Pietra Ligure, Liguria
 Pieve Ligure, Liguria
 Portofino, Liguria
 Porto Venere, Liguria
 Rapallo, Liguria
 Recco, Liguria
 Riomaggiore, Liguria
 Riva Ligure, Liguria
 San Bartolomeo al Mare, Liguria
 Sanremo, Liguria
 Santa Margherita Ligure, Liguria
 Santo Stefano al Mare, Liguria
 Sarzana, Liguria
 Savona, Liguria
 Sestri Levante, Liguria
 Sori, Liguria
 Spotorno, Liguria
 Taggia, Liguria
 Vado Ligure, Liguria
 Vallecrosia, Liguria
 Varazze, Liguria
 Ventimiglia, Liguria
 Vernazza, Liguria
 Zoagli, Liguria
 Falconara Marittima, Marche
 Fano, Marche
 Gabicce Mare, Marche
 Porto Recanati, Marche
 Porto Sant'Elpidio, Marche
 San Benedetto del Tronto, Marche
 Senigallia, Marche
 Campomarino, Molise
 Montenero di Bisaccia, Molise
 Petacciato, Molise
 Termoli, Molise
 Alghero, Sardinia
 Costa Smeralda, Sardinia
 Olbia, Sardinia
 Poetto, Sardinia
 Porto Cervo, Sardinia
 Porto Rotondo, Sardinia
 Porto Torres, Sardinia
 Sassari, Sardinia
 Agrigento, Sicily
 Avola, Sicily
 Barcellona Pozzo di Gotto, Sicily
 Capo d'Orlando, Sicily
 Cefalù, Sicily
 Gela, Sicily
 Giardini Naxos, Sicily
 Marina di Ragusa, Sicily
 Marsala, Sicily
 Mazara del Vallo, Sicily
 Milazzo, Sicily
 Noto, Sicily
 Pachino, Sicily
 Siracusa, Sicily
 Termini Imerese, Sicily
 Trapani, Sicily
 Capraia, Tuscany
 Campo nell'Elba, Elba, Tuscany
 Capoliveri, Elba, Tuscany
 Marciana, Elba, Tuscany
 Marciana Marina, Elba, Tuscany
 Porto Azzurro, Elba, Tuscany
 Portoferraio, Elba, Tuscany
 Rio Marina, Elba, Tuscany
 Rio nell'Elba, Elba, Tuscany
 Giglio Island, Tuscany
 Bibbona, Tuscany
 Camaiore, Tuscany
 Capalbio, Tuscany
 Carrara, Tuscany
 Castagneto Carducci, Tuscany
 Castiglione della Pescaia, Tuscany
 Cecina, Tuscany
 Follonica, Tuscany
 Forte dei Marmi, Tuscany
 Grosseto, Tuscany
 Leghorn, Tuscany
 Magliano in Toscana, Tuscany
 Massa, Tuscany
 Monte Argentario, Tuscany
 Montignoso, Tuscany
 Orbetello, Tuscany
 Pietrasanta, Tuscany
 Piombino, Tuscany
 Pisa, Tuscany
 Rosignano Marittimo, Tuscany
 San Giuliano Terme, Tuscany
 San Vincenzo, Tuscany
 Scarlino, Tuscany
 Vecchiano, Tuscany
 Viareggio, Tuscany
 Albarella, Veneto
 Barricata, Veneto
 Bibione, Veneto
 Caorle, Veneto
 Cavallino (Jesolo), Veneto
 Eraclea, Veneto
 Jesolo, Veneto
 Rosolina, Veneto
 Sottomarina, Isolaverde, Veneto
 Venice Lido, Veneto

See also
 List of beaches

References

Lists of landforms of Italy
Italy
Atlantic Ocean-related lists
Beaches